The Catholic University of Korea (hangul : 가톨릭대학교  hanja) is a private Roman Catholic institution of higher education in South Korea. It was established in 1855. The Catholic University of Korea operates campuses in Seoul and in the neighboring Bucheon City. The university's medical school, considered one of the most prestigious in South Korea, has eight affiliated hospitals in major cities of the country.

The university has been consistently ranked as one of the premier universities in South Korea and has been regarded in both national and international university rankings. The Catholic University was ranked no. 482 in QS World University 2022 Rankings.

The Catholic University of Korea offers bachelor's degrees, master's degrees, and doctoral degrees: Theology, Korean Language, Philosophy, History, English Language and Literature, Chinese Language and Culture, Japanese Language and Culture, French Language and Culture, Music, Social Sciences, Social Welfare, Psychology, Sociology, Business Administration, Accounting, International Studies, Law Economics, Chemistry, Mathematics, Physics, Biotechnology, Environmental Engineering, Computer Science and Engineering, Information Systems Engineering, Culture Contents, Media Engineering, Clothing and Textiles, Food and Nutrition, Medicine, and Nursing.

Academics
The university has a policy of "inbound globalization", requiring all freshmen to live in the English language dormitory which can accommodate 1,200 students and professors. Residents are encouraged to communicate only in English during the program, which usually runs for a whole semester.
In accordance with the "inbound globalization" policy, the university is equipped with faculty members with esteemed academic backgrounds; professors, professionals, and researchers from the United States, United Kingdom, Singapore, Canada, China, Germany, and Japan, among others.

Undergraduate and Graduate programs
Programs
School of Theology
Department of Theology
School of Humanities
Department of Korean Language & Literature
Department of Philosophy
Department of Korean History
School of Religious Studies
English Language and Culture
Department of English Language & Literature
Department of English Language & Culture
East Asian Languages and Cultures
Department of Chinese Language & Culture
Department of Japanese Language & Culture
French Language and Culture
Department of French Language and Culture
School of Music
Department of Music
School of Social Sciences
Department of Social Welfare
Department of Psychology
Department of Sociology
Special Education
Department of Special Education
School of Business Administration
Department of Business Administration
Department of Accounting
School of International Studies
Department of American Studies
Department of Chinese Studies
Department of International Relations
Department of International Trade
School of Law, Economics & Public Administration
Department of Law
Department of Public Administration & Economics 
Department of Economics
Department of Public Administration
School of Natural Sciences
Department of Chemistry
Department of Mathematics
Department of Physics
School of Biotechnology and Environmental Engineering
Department of Life Science
Department of Biotechnology
Department of Environmental Engineering
School of Computer Science and Information Engineering
Department of Computer Science and Engineering
Department of Information Systems Engineering
Information, Communications and Electronic Engineering
Department of Information, Communications and Electronic Engineering
School of Digital Media
Department of Culture Contents
Department of Media Engineering
School of Human Ecology
Department of Consumer & Housing
Department of Clothing & Textiles 
Department of Child & Family Studies
Department of Food & Nutrition
School of Medicine
Department of Medicine
School of Nursing
Department of Nursing

Academic rankings
 Ranked 4th in the fields of education and finance, (Joong-Ang Ilbo's General Evaluation of Universities, 2014)
 Ranked 400–500 in QS World University Rankings 2016/17.
 Ranked 99th in Asia University Rankings 2013/14 (QS World University Rankings)
 Ranked 400–500 in Academic Ranking of World Universities, ARWU US, 2014
 Ranked 1st in student-faculty ratio, overall proportion of faculty and student enrollment (Joong-Ang Ilbo's General Evaluation of Universities, 2010)

History
The university traces its roots to St. Joseph's Seminary  in Baeron, a Catholic refuge in modern-day Jecheon, North Chungcheong province. It was founded in 1855 before Christianity was legalized.  After the legalization of Christianity, the school moved to Yongsan-gu, Seoul, in 1887, and was renamed Seminary of Sacred Heart of Jesus.  A hospital associated with the seminary was opened in 1936.  The seminary became Songsin College in 1947 and the medical school was established in 1954.  The name was later changed to Catholic College.  Songsim Women's College (Songsim, or 聖心, means 'Sacred Heart' in Korean)  was founded in 1964; the two colleges were merged in 1995 to form the present-day entity of Catholic University.

Seoul St. Mary's Hospital

Seoul St. Mary's Hospital is one of the affiliated hospitals of Catholic University of Korea and is part of the CMC (Catholic Medical Center) network. The new hospital opened on 30 April 2009 in the campus of Catholic University of Korea; it is the largest hospital building unit in Korea with 1,355 beds, including Intensive care unit (ICU) 110 beds. Sun Myung Moon was admitted there and died there in 2012.

Yeouido St. Mary's Hospital

Yeouido St. Mary's Hospital is one of the affiliated hospitals of the university. It is an International Healthcare Center opened in February 2013 in Yeounido, Seoul becoming the only university hospital in Yeouido the financial district of Seoul. It signed a Memorandum of Understanding with Seoul Metropolitan City in 2010 and strives for the convenience of foreign patients.

Campus and buildings
Catholic University Campus of the Holy Spirit, Hyehwa-dong, Jongno-gu, Seoul

Old Seoul Fortress
Library of Theology
Jinri Hall
University Church
Theological Seminary
Sungshin Hall

Catholic University Campus of the Sacred Heart, Yeokgok 2-dong, Wonmi-gu, Bucheon, Gyeonggi-do

Stephen Cardinal Kim Sou-hwan gwan (Memorial and the 150th anniversary of International Research and Training Institute of the Sacred Heart)
Michael Hall
Maria Hall
Gisen Hall
Nicholls Hall
Sophie Barat Hall
Virtus Hall
Songsim Hall
Nicolas Cardinal Cheong Pharmacy Hall
Concert Hall (Grand Auditorium)
Chapel of the Sacred Heart
Veritas Hall (Central Library)
Bambino Hall

Catholic University Campus of Sincerity, Banpo-dong, Seocho-gu, Seoul

Medical campus

Notable people
Stephen Kim Sou-hwan, cardinal
Yoo Ji-tae, actor

See also
List of colleges and universities in South Korea
Education in South Korea

References

External links
Official school website, in Korean
Official school website, in English
Article on new bioethics graduate school at the university

 
Universities and colleges in Gyeonggi Province
Universities and colleges in Seoul
Educational institutions established in 1855
1855 establishments in Korea
Bucheon
Jongno District
Seocho District
Private universities and colleges in South Korea